The 2022 Dubai Sevens was the second tournament within the 2022–23 World Rugby Sevens Series and was the 22nd international edition and the 52nd overall of the Dubai Sevens since it began in 1970. It was held on 3–4 December 2022 at The Sevens Stadium in Dubai, United Arab Emirates.

Format 
The twelve teams at each tournament were drawn into three pools of four teams. A round-robin was held for each pool, where each team played the others in their pool once. The top two teams from each pool, plus the two best third-placed on comparative pool standings, advanced to the Cup quarterfinals to compete for tournament honours. The other teams from each pool went to the challenge playoffs for ninth to twelfth place.

Teams
Fifteen core teams participated in the tournament along with one invited team, Uganda.

Pool stage
All times in UAE Standard Time (UTC+4:00)

Pool A

Pool B

Pool C

Pool D

Placement matches

Thirteenth place

Ninth place

Cup

Fifth place

Cup playoffs

Tournament placings

Source: World Rugby

Players

See also
 2022 Dubai Women's Sevens
 World Rugby Sevens Series
 2022–23 World Rugby Sevens Series

References

External links 
 Tournament site
 World Rugby info

2022
2022–23 World Rugby Sevens Series
2022 in Emirati sport
2022 in Asian rugby union
Dubai Sevens